The Bridgewater–Centreville Border Crossing connects the towns of Bridgewater, Maine and Centreville, New Brunswick on the Canada–US border. The crossing is reached by Boundary Line Road on the American side and by New Brunswick Route 110 on the Canadian side. The US and Canadian governments both built new border stations at this crossing in 1976.  In 2012, the US replaced its border station once again. It is open from 6am to 10pm.

See also
 List of Canada–United States border crossings

References

Canada–United States border crossings
Transportation buildings and structures in Aroostook County, Maine
1936 establishments in Maine
1936 establishments in New Brunswick